Albert Lawrence "Slim" Rasmussen (October 10, 1909 – January 6, 1993) was an American politician in the state of Washington. He served in the Washington House of Representatives from 1949 to 1961 for district 28, and in the Senate from 1961 to his resignation in November 1967 due to his election as Mayor of Tacoma. He served again in the Senate from October 1971 to fill the unexpired term of John T. McCutcheon, and would serve until his death on January 7, 1993.

References

1993 deaths
1909 births
Mayors of Tacoma, Washington
Democratic Party Washington (state) state senators
Democratic Party members of the Washington House of Representatives
Pierce County Councillors
Politicians from Everett, Washington
20th-century American politicians